Royal and Louise Morrow House, also known as Stone Cottage, is a historic home located at Brevard, Transylvania County, North Carolina.  It was built in 1915, and is a -story, Bungalow / American Craftsman style stone dwelling.  It has a steep, side-gable roof and three-bay wall dormers.  Also on the property is a contributing garage.

It was listed on the National Register of Historic Places in 2006.  It is located in the East Main Street Historic District.

References

Houses on the National Register of Historic Places in North Carolina
Houses completed in 1915
Houses in Transylvania County, North Carolina
National Register of Historic Places in Transylvania County, North Carolina
Historic district contributing properties in North Carolina